Qimat Rai Gupta (also known as Q R Gupta and QRG) was an Indian entrepreneur, founder, former chairman and managing director of Havells, a global electrical company.  Gupta was among the 100 richest Indians, and on Forbes list of global billionaires.

Early life
Gupta was born in 1937 in Malerkotla, Punjab, British India (Present-day Punjab, India) in a Punjabi Hindu Family.

Havells
, Havells is among the top five lighting brands in the world  with market cap of above  billion.

Healthcare 
Gupta started QRG Central Hospital and multi-specialty healthcare facility QRG Health City in Faridabad.

Awards
 EY Entrepreneur Of The Year Award 2013

Family
Qimat Gupta was married to Vinod and had two sons and one daughter. Only his second son Anil Rai Gupta is part of the business, and succeeded his father as Havells' Chairman. Gupta died at the age of 77 due to cardiac arrest on 7 November 2014.

References

Indian industrialists
People from New Delhi
Indian billionaires
Businesspeople from Delhi
1937 births
2014 deaths
Indian company founders
20th-century Indian businesspeople